Obed Israel Enamorado Palacios (born 15 September 1985 in Tela, Atlántida, Honduras) is a Honduran footballer who currently plays as a goalkeeper for Liga Nacional de Honduras club Vida.

Club career
He was the only keeper to be ever-present in the 2011 Apertura season.

International career
Enamorado played for the Honduras national football team at the 2008 Summer Olympics.

Career statistics

Personal life
On 2 April 2014, Obed's girlfriend Diana Vallecillo was killed in a car accident when on her way to Tegucigalpa.

References

1985 births
Living people
People from Tela
Association football goalkeepers
Honduran footballers
Footballers at the 2008 Summer Olympics
Olympic footballers of Honduras
C.D.S. Vida players
Liga Nacional de Fútbol Profesional de Honduras players